Villafranca de los Barros is a municipality in the province of Badajoz, Extremadura, Spain. It has a population of 13,329 and an area of 104 km².

References

Municipalities in the Province of Badajoz